Sergey Nikolayevich Zuev (February 20, 1980, Severouralsk, USSR) is a Russian futsal player. He plays as a goalkeeper for the Moscow club Dina Moscow, and formerly played in the Russian national futsal team. Following the results of eight seasons he was voted the best goalkeeper of the Russian championship, and after 2008 he was voted world’s best goalkeeper. Master of Sports (since March 27, 2012).

Biography

Youth
Zuev was born in Severouralsk - a small town in the Sverdlovsk region. When he was seven years old, his parents took him to a local hockey club. For a long time, Sergei played hockey as a goalkeeper, took part in various regional competitions.

When playing hockey, Sergey often played futsal at training sessions. Being a part of futsal club "Smena" from his native city, he won the championship of Russia among the teams of his age. On his way home, his head coach of the futsal team UPI Sergey Bannikov, who offered Zuev to become part of the OIP and to pursue a career in his club, was waiting for Sergey at the Yekaterinburg railway station.

UPI
Zuev’s debut for the students’ team within the Premier League of the Russian mini-football took place in 1997/98. That season he took part in only two games, but in the following season he took part in 25 matches and even scored a goal to the gate of Ugra TSH. Sergey won a place of the first goalkeeper and then was rarely changed at the gate with his colleague, who was also his roommate - Nicholas Bezruchenko.
In 2000 Zuev became a member of Russian national team at Student World Cup in Brazil.
 

The Russian team won bronze at that tournament, and that success brought to Sergei the title of Master of Sports.

Viz-Sinara and the national team
In summer 2001, Zuev moved to another club of Yekaterinburg - VIZ. That club applied to the highest positions. Young goalkeeper immediately took his place in the goal. Due to his game VIZ took the second place in the regular championship and reached the play-off semifinal. According to the final results the Yekaterinburg club became only the fourth, but Zuev had a bright season and was recognized the best goalkeeper of the tournament.

On March 20, 2002 Zuev first played in the Russian national futsal team in an exhibition game against Argentina. In August, Sergey once again became a member of a student team at the Student World Cup, but this time the Russians won the champion’s title. Zuev was keeping the goal in most of the games, including the final against Italy. And at the end of the same year Sergei debuted in official matches of the first national team, replacing Alexei Yevteyev in an qualifying game of the European Championship 2003 against Israel.

In the next season Zuev helped "Viz-Sinara" to win the bronze medal and was again voted the best goalkeeper of the championship. A similar situation (bronze for the club and recognition at the end of the season) repeated in the next two seasons. Yekaterinburg club won silver twice, and in 2007  it won its first trophy after beating Moscow club Dinamo in the final of the Cup of Russia. Zuev was keeping the goal of "Viz-Sinara" in both finals and in the penalty shootout.

While working on improving himself in the club Sergei took the position of the first goalkeeper of Russia. He became the part of the European Championship even 2003, but he ended badly for the Russians. But in 2005 and 2007 respectively, the Russian team won the silver and bronze European Championship, and it was her first Zuev goalkeeper at these tournaments.

Victories in Russia and Europe
In the season 2007/08, "Viz-Sinara" held its debut in the UEFA Cup on mini-football. At the first dash the Ekaterinburg club managed to get out of the group stage. In the semifinal Yekaterinburg competed with Kazakhstan "Kairat" and reached the final of the tournament, where they met with the Spanish "El Pozo". The overtime did not reveal the winner, he had to be determined in a penalty shootout. Sergey Zuev became the hero of that series, repulsing three penalties and bringing to his team the title of the strongest in Europe.

In the end of 2008, Zuev as a part of the national team took part in the World Cup of his career. The Russian team took the fourth place, and Sergei was the first goalkeeper of the team. It was for his play in the tournament, as well as in the victorious UEFA Cup mini-football, that he was named the best goalkeeper of the world in 2008, according to the «UMBRO Futsal Awards».

In the 2008/09 season, "Viz-Sinara" managed to break the hegemony of the Moscow "Dinamo" club and to become the champion of Russia in mini-football. Yekaterinburg repeated its success a year later. Following the results of the two championship seasons Zuev was recognized as the best goalkeeper of the championship of Russia. He was declared the best in the 2010/11 season, when Yekaterinburg took the second place. That made Sergei the eight-time winner of the award, which is a record result.

Achievements
 UEFA Cup Winner  2007/08
 Champion of Russia (2): 2008/09, 2009/10
 Russian Cup Winner: 2007
 Silver medalist of UEFA Futsal Championship (2): 2005, 2012
 Bronze medalist of UEFA Futsal Championship, 2007
 Semifinalist of FIFA Futsal World Cup, 2008
 Winner of the student FIFA Futsal World Cup, 2002

Personal achievements
 The best goalkeeper of Russian League: of the championship of Russia (8): 2001/02, 2002/03, 2003/04, 2004/05, 2007/08, 2008/09, 2009/10, 2010/11

References

External links
AMFR profile
MFK Dina Moskva profile
Sergey Zuev at Futsalplanet.com

1980 births
Living people
Futsal goalkeepers
Russian men's futsal players
MFK Dina Moskva players
People from Severouralsk
Sportspeople from Sverdlovsk Oblast